Chase Motor Truck Company (1907-1919), founded by Aurin M. Chase, was a manufacturer of trucks in Syracuse, New York. The vehicles were known for their air-cooled engines and simplicity of design.

The company also produced a utility wagon in the form of an automobile, which could be converted for use in business or pleasure. With a few minor changes the car could also be utilized as a commercial wagon.

It has been estimated that as many as 5,000 Chase vehicles were produced. Fewer than 30-40 Chase trucks are still in existence today.

Advertisements

External links 

 The Automobile Collection of the Owls Head Transportation Museum - 1909 Chase Truck

References 

Motor vehicle manufacturers based in Syracuse, New York
Defunct truck manufacturers of the United States
Defunct motor vehicle manufacturers of the United States
Brass Era vehicles
American companies established in 1907
Vehicle manufacturing companies established in 1907
Manufacturing companies disestablished in 1919
1907 establishments in New York (state)
1919 disestablishments in New York (state)
1900s cars
1910s cars
Defunct companies based in Syracuse, New York
American companies disestablished in 1919
Defunct manufacturing companies based in New York (state)